Robert Bennet may refer to:

 Robert Bennet (bishop) (died 1617), English bishop
 Robert Bennet of Chesters, Scottish gentleman and prisoner on the Bass Rock
 Robert Bennet (surveyor) ( 1621–1622), English surveyor and politician
 Robert Bennet (Roundhead) (1605–1683), English politician
 Robert Bennet (theologian) (died 1687), English theologian and writer
 Robert Ames Bennet (1870–1954), American western and science fiction writer
 Bob Bennet (1879–1962), New Zealand rugby union player

See also
 Robert Bennett (disambiguation)